Bonnetia jauensis is a species of flowering plant in the Bonnetiaceae family found only in Venezuela.

References

jauaensis
Endemic flora of Venezuela
Vulnerable plants
Plants described in 1976
Taxonomy articles created by Polbot
Taxa named by Bassett Maguire
Taxobox binomials not recognized by IUCN